American River is a waterway in the U.S. state of Alaska. Situated on the northwestern portion of Seward Peninsula, it is the eastern and larger fork of the Agiapuk River. It joins the Agiapuk River in a broad, gravel-filled basin, and for  up, is characterized by a wide flood plain and a meandering course. It receives a number of large tributaries from the east, which also have wide floodplains developed in their lower parts. The important tributaries are Portage Creek, Budd Creek, and Igloo Creek, while smaller tributaries are Burke, Gold Run, Dome, and Camp creeks. All of these tributaries received some attention from gold prospectors. The river is easily navigable for small boats for several miles above the mouth of Portage Creek, and the region can also be reached from Teller. Gold had been discovered in the region in September 1901, and a number of the streams were known to be gold-bearing to some extent.

Tributaries
The bed rock at the head of the river consists of the limestones of the Port Clarence formation. These limestones are little altered and are not mineralized to any extent. At the month of Portage Creek, the bed rock consists of calcareous mica-schists and limestones. Through the last  before entering the American River, a broad flood plain is developed, within which the creek has a very sinuous course. Along Portage Creek, limestones and calcareous mica-schiste, with occasional beds of graphitic schist, constitute the bed rock.

About  from its mouth, it receives a large tributary, Windy Creek, from the south side. The bed rock on Budd Creek is composed of crystalline limestones, calcareous mica-schists, and graphitic schists, usually striking in a north–south direction, and having dips varying from 0° to 70°. Kugruk Mountain, a few miles east of the forks of Budd Creek, is made up of quartz-mica-schist, which has been thrown up into an anticline. Below the forks, the creek sinks, leaving its bed dry except in times of high water. This sink occurs where a massive bed of limestone, dipping downstream at a small angle, cuts across the creek.

Near the head of the creek, its bed contains many boulders of greenstone, which are derived from sills intruded in the limestone near its head. The valley of Windy Creek is broad and gravel filled. Along the sides of the valley, back from the creek bed, the gravel extends up the slopes, forming some well-marked gravel benches. A cut bank of the creek shows  of muck overlying  of gravel.

Igloo Creek, also called on some maps Lewis Creek, enters the American River a few miles above its junction with the Agiapuk. This creek, like Budd Creek, flows west across the strike of the bed rock, which, as on Budd Creek, consists of limestones, calcareous and graphitic schists, with some intruded sills of greenstone, which are highly altered. Like Budd Creek, Igloo Creek sinks for about a mile of its course, probably in crossing the same bed of limestone that causes the sink on Budd Creek. In its lower course, Igloo Creek meanders over a broad flood plain, from which the hills rise by very gentle slopes to the flat-topped upland. Igloo Creek, except where it sinks in passing over limestone beds, carries a large amount of water.

References

Rivers of the Seward Peninsula
Rivers of Alaska
Rivers of Nome Census Area, Alaska
Rivers of Unorganized Borough, Alaska